Hoylandswaine is a village in the Metropolitan Borough of Barnsley, South Yorkshire, England.

Located near Penistone and west of the M1 along the A628 it enjoys easy access to more significant locales such as Sheffield, Barnsley, and Leeds.

Local events 
Annually, there is a "Scarecrow Festival". The festival consists of villagers creating their own scarecrows, often with locally sourced hay, and placing them around the village. Children can then go and, for a small cost, pick up a sheet with activities relating to the scarecrows.

Education 
The local school primary school is Hoylandswaine Primary School, located within the village. The majority of secondary students go to Penistone Grammar School, and some go to Penistone Grammar Post-16 for further education.

Nail forge 
Historically, Hoylandswaine produced nails. The nail forge ceased operations shortly after the Second World War, and is currently a Grade II listed building. The forge is normally open to the public in September.

See also
Listed buildings in Penistone

External links 

 Hoylandswaine Village Hall
 VisitPenistone: Hoylandswaine Nail Forge

Villages in South Yorkshire